The Ministry of Agriculture and Rural Development is a department of the Albanian Government in charge of regulation of the economic activity in the agricultural sector of the country with a purpose of increasing the sector's production capacity.

The ministry is responsible for agriculture, rural development, food safety and consumer protection, fisheries and aquaculture, and waters administration. It was formed as the Ministry of Agriculture within the special cabinet created on December 4, 1912, right after the Declaration of Independence, with the first minister Pandeli Cale.

History
Since the establishment of the institution, the Ministry of Agriculture has been reorganized by joining other departments or merging with other ministries, thus making its name change several times.

 Ministry of Agriculture (1912–1914)
 Ministry of Public Works and Agriculture (1921–1925), (1927)
 Ministry of Agriculture (1927–1928)
 Ministry of Agriculture and Forestry (1928–1930)
 Minister State Secretary of Agriculture and Forestry (1943)
 Ministry of Agriculture (1945–1953)
 Ministry of Agriculture and Collections (1953–1954)
 Ministry of Agriculture (1954–1992)
 Ministry of Agriculture and Food (1992–1998)
 Ministry of Agriculture (1998–2001)
 Ministry of Agriculture and Food (2001–2005)
 Ministry of Agriculture, Food and Consumer Protection (2005–2013)
 Ministry of Agriculture, Rural Development and Water Administration (2013–2017)
 Ministry of Agriculture and Rural Development (2017–current)

Subordinate institutions
 Agriculture Directorates (13)
 Directorate of Agricultural Production and Trade Policies
 Directorates of Irrigation and Drainage (4)
 Transfer Centers of Agriculture Technologies (QTTB)
 National Food Authority (AKU)
 Agency for Rural Agricultural Development (AZHBR)
 Institute of Veterinary and Food Safety (ISUV)
 Directorate of Fishery Service and Aquaculture
 National Tobacco Agency
 State Entity of Seeds and Saplings
 Institute of Technological Research
 State Water Inspectorate
 Agency for the Development of Mountainous Regions
 Regional Environmental Agencies
 Water Basin Agencies (6)

Officeholders (1912–present)

Notes

See also
 Agriculture in Albania

References

Agriculture, Food, And Consumer Protection
Ministries established in 1912
Albania
Agricultural organizations based in Albania
1912 establishments in Albania